Moslemabad may refer to:
 Moslemabad, Fars
 Moslemabad, Hamadan
 Moslemabad, Isfahan
 Moslemabad, Markazi
 Moslemabad, Mazandaran
 Moslemabad, Nishapur, Razavi Khorasan Province
 Moslemabad, Sabzevar, Razavi Khorasan Province